The  was held at Nagai Stadium in Osaka. Organised by JAAF, the four-day competition took place from 24-27 June and served as the national championships in track and field for the Japan. The competition intended also to serve as the qualifying trial for Japan at the 2020 Summer Olympics.

Results

Men

Women

Results

References

Results
105th Japan Ch. Yanmar Stadium Nagai, Osaka (JPN) 24–27 JUN 2021 B. World Athletics. Retrieved 2021-06-30.

External links
 Official website at JAAF

2021
Japan Outdoors
Athletics
Sport in Osaka Prefecture
Japan Championships